Delisea is a genus of red algae in the family Bonnemaisoniaceae.

The genus name of Delisea is in honour of French botanist and lichenologist Dominique François Delise (1780-1841).

The genus was circumscribed by Jean Vincent Félix Lamouroux in Dict. Sci. Nat. (F. Cuvier) Vol.13 on page 41 in 1819.

References

External links 
 

Bonnemaisoniales
Red algae genera